Stuffley Knob is the tallest mountain in Johnson County, Kentucky, with a summit elevation of 1,496 feet (456 m) above sea level.

References

External links
 MountainZone.com
 US-Places.com

Mountains of Kentucky
Landforms of Johnson County, Kentucky